Princess Augusta of Schleswig-Holstein-Sonderburg-Glücksburg (27 June 1633 – 26 May 1701) was a Danish-German princess of the senior Glücksburg line of the Duke of Schleswig-Holstein. She was the first Duchess of Augustenborg by marriage. Augustenborg palace, and as a consequence the nearby town, were named in honor of her.

The great-granddaughter of king Christian III of Denmark, she was the third daughter, eighth by birth, of Philip, Duke of Schleswig-Holstein-Sonderburg-Glücksburg and Princess Sophia Hedwig of Saxe-Lauenburg. She was sister of Sophia Dorothea of Schleswig-Holstein-Sonderburg-Glücksburg

Family and children
On 15 June 1651, at Copenhagen, she married her first cousin Ernest Günther (14 October 1609 – 18 January 1689), son of Duke Alexander of Schleswig-Holstein-Sonderburg and his wife Countess Dorothea of Schwarzburg-Sondershausen. They had ten children:

 Frederick (10 December 1652 – 3 August 1692)
 Sofie Amalie (25 August 1654 – 7 December 1655)
 Philipp Ernst (24 October 1655 – 8 September 1677)
 Sofie Auguste (2 February 1657 – 20 July 1657)
 Luise Charlotte (13 April 1658 – 2 May 1740), married on 1 January 1685 to Duke Frederick Louis of Holstein-Sonderburg-Beck
 Ernestine Justine (30 July 1659 – 18 October 1662)
 Ernest Augustus (3 October 1660 – 11 May 1731)
 Dorothea Luise (11 October 1663 – 21 April 1721), Abbess of Itzehoe in 1686-1721
 a child, born and died 18 December 1665
 Frederick William (18 November 1668 – 3 June 1714)

References

Ancestry

1633 births
1701 deaths
People from Schleswig-Flensburg
House of Augustenburg
17th-century German women
18th-century German women